Astafyev is a Russian surname. Notable people with the surname include:

Maksim Astafyev (born 1982), Russian  football player
Mikhail Astafyev (born 1946), Russian politician
Vasily Astafyev (1919–2022), Soviet military personnel
Viktor Astafyev (1924–2001), Soviet and Russian writer of short stories and novels

See also
11027 Astafʹev, main-belt asteroid
Serafina Astafieva

Russian-language surnames